is a railway station on the Hokuriku Railroad Ishikawa Line in the city of Nonoichi, Ishikawa, Japan, operated by the private railway operator Hokuriku Railroad (Hokutetsu).

Lines

Station layout
The station consists of one side platform serving a single bi-directional track. The station is unattended.

Adjacent stations

History
Nonoichi-Kōdaimae Station opened on 11 August 1931.

Surrounding area
 Kanazawa Institute of Technology
 Kanazawa College of Technology
 Kanazawa Welfare College
 Nonoichi Public Library
 Nonoichi Chuo Community Center

See also
 List of railway stations in Japan

References

External links

  

Railway stations in Ishikawa Prefecture
Railway stations in Japan opened in 1931
Hokuriku Railroad Ishikawa Line
Nonoichi, Ishikawa